Mitošević is a Serbian surname, a patronymic derived from the Slavic given name Mitoš. It may refer to:

Vuk Mitošević (born 1991), Serbian footballer
Dušan Mitošević (born 1949), Serbian football manager and former player

Serbian surnames